Pestino is a rural locality (a village) in Korobitsynskoye Rural Settlement, Syamzhensky District, Vologda Oblast, Russia. The population was 2 as of 2002.

Geography 
Pestino is located 41 km southeast of Syamzha (the district's administrative centre) by road. Vysokovo is the nearest rural locality.

References 

Rural localities in Syamzhensky District
Kadnikovsky Uyezd